Kevin Henderson (born 8 June 1974) is an English former professional footballer who played in the Football League as a striker for Burnley, Hartlepool United and Carlisle United. He also played non-league football for Morpeth Town and Gateshead.

References

External links
 League stats at Neil Brown's site

1974 births
Living people
Sportspeople from Ashington
Footballers from Northumberland
English footballers
Association football forwards
Burnley F.C. players
Hartlepool United F.C. players
Carlisle United F.C. players
Gateshead F.C. players
English Football League players
Northern Premier League players
Northern Football League players
Morpeth Town A.F.C. players